Wilsons Creek is a locality in the Northern Rivers region of New South Wales, Australia in Byron Shire. It is in the valley of what is now named the Wilsons River and is 5 km from Mullumbimby. It has a public school and numerous farms along the river. At the 2016 federal election the Wilsons Creek polling booth recorded one of the highest green votes in the nation, with over 60% of voters giving the Australian Greens their first preference.

References

Towns in New South Wales
Northern Rivers